Demont Mitchell (born 24 October 1988) is a retired association football player from The Bahamas who had his career cut short by injuries suffered in a car accident.

He has dual American-Bahamian citizenship.

Club career
As a child, Mitchell had trials with Southampton and Wolverhampton Wanderers in the English football league. He played for Bears FC in the Bahamas before joining the Hofstra University in 2006.

International career
Mitchell made his debut for the senior Bahamas in a March 2008 World Cup qualification match against the British Virgin Islands and has earned a total of six caps, scoring 1 goal, all of them in World Cup qualification games.

His final international was in July 2011 against the Turks and Caicos Islands.

Personal life
Mitchell suffered a serious brain injury in a car accident in the Bahamas in October 2012 which left him in a coma for three weeks. A foundation dedicated to spread brain injury awareness was named after him in 2014. Also, a soccer tournament was staged in June 2015 to help in covering his medical expenses.

References

External links
 

1988 births
Living people
Sportspeople from Nassau, Bahamas
Association football midfielders
Bahamian footballers
Bahamas international footballers
Hofstra Pride men's soccer players
Bahamian expatriate footballers
Expatriate soccer players in the United States
Bahamian expatriate sportspeople in the United States
Bears FC players
Bahamas under-20 international footballers